San Francisco Ozolotepec  is a town and municipality in Oaxaca in south-western Mexico. The municipality covers an area of  km². 
It is part of the Miahuatlán District in the south of the Sierra Sur Region.

As of 2020, the municipality had a total population of 2182.

References

Municipalities of Oaxaca